Nonacris is a genus of flies in the family Stratiomyidae.

Species
Nonacris brevicornis Enderlein, 1921
Nonacris chilensis Lindner, 1943
Nonacris hamata James, 1975
Nonacris laminata James, 1975
Nonacris longicornis Enderlein, 1921
Nonacris nigriventris Enderlein, 1921
Nonacris partitifrons Enderlein, 1921
Nonacris scutellaris Enderlein, 1921
Nonacris transequa Walker, 1856

References

Stratiomyidae
Brachycera genera
Taxa named by Francis Walker (entomologist)
Diptera of South America